XETB-AM is a radio station on 1350 AM in Gómez Palacio, Durango. It is owned by Grupo Radio Centro

History
XETB came to air on September 24, 1931, making it the first station in the region. Original authorization was given to begin operations on February 14, 1935, with 125 watts. XETB was then on 1310 kHz and owned by Miguel Guangorena Salas. It originally operated from Torreón, Coahuila and still has its studios there. Amelio G. Zaragoza acquired XETB in 1935 and sold it to Radio Laguna, S.A., in 1947. XETB later moved to 1350 kHz and increased its power to 5,000 watts.

XETB carries a variety of news, talk and music programs.

On October 26, 2022, acting on an 11-year-old application, the Federal Telecommunications Institute (IFT) approved the migration of XETB to FM as XHETB-FM 89.1 in exchange for a one-time payment of 1.72 million pesos.

References

Radio stations in Durango
Radio stations in the Comarca Lagunera
Radio stations established in 1931
Grupo Radio Centro